Wotton-under-Edge  is a market town in the Stroud district of Gloucestershire, England. Near the southern fringe of the Cotswolds, the Cotswold Way long-distance footpath passes through the settlement. The nearest railway station is Cam and Dursley railway station,  from the town centre.

History 
The first record of the town is in an Anglo-Saxon Royal Charter of King Edmund I, who in AD 940 leased four hides of land in Wudetun to Eadric. The name Wudetun means the enclosure, homestead or village (tun) in or near the wood (wude).  The "Edge" refers to the limestone escarpment of the Cotswold Edge which includes the hills of Wotton Hill and Tor Hill that flank the town. In the 1086 Domesday Book listing, Wotton was in the hundred of Dudstone.  Kingswood Abbey was founded in 1139, but all that remains is a 16th-century Cistercian gatehouse. Nearby historical buildings include the Tudor houses of Newark Park and Owlpen Manor, both open to the public at set times.  The medieval former public house The Ancient Ram Inn dates back to 1145.  The original town was burnt down during the reign of King John (1199–1216); it was rebuilt in 1252 and a charter granted to Johanna de Berkeley authorising her to hold a market and a three-day annual fair on the Feast of the Cross. In 1272 the inhabitants of the borough were authorised to elect one of their members as a Mayor, a practice that continued every year until 1886.

St. Mary the Virgin was consecrated in 1283, and is the oldest and largest church in the town.  The Katharine Lady Berkeley's Grammar School was established in 1384 and is now a comprehensive named Katharine Lady Berkeley's School although the present modern building is a little outside of the town on the way to the village of Kingswood.  The British School was established in the village in 1835.

The Battle of Nibley Green occurred near the Ancient Ram Inn in 1470 (or 1469 under the calendar of the time), when the building was owned by Thomas Talbot, 2nd Viscount Lisle. William de Berkeley, 1st Marquess of Berkeley led the forces that beat the Viscount, and after the battle his men sacked the manor.  Overlooking the town on the top of Wotton Hill are a collection of trees planted in the 19th century to commemorate the Battle of Waterloo. These are situated on the site that housed one of the early warning beacons used to warn England of the approach of the Spanish Armada in 1588.
  New Mills, founded in 1810, prospered by supplying both sides in the Napoleonic wars but after a century of decline the mill was near to closing in 1981 when it was acquired by Renishaw plc.

The town's corporation status was abolished in 1886 following the Municipal Corporations Act of 1883.

Governance 
An electoral ward with the same name exists. The ward mainly covers Wotton-under-Edge but also stretches to North Nibley. The total population of the ward taken at the 2011 census was 6,510.

Facilities 
The town is relatively well served for a town of its size. It has several pubs and a hotel, and a range of takeaways and restaurants. It has several active social groups, such as Scouts, Guides, a gardening club and the Wotton Lions.  In 1958, local people and school students built the town swimming pool, which was completed in 1961. Subsequently the pool has had solar and electric heating installed.  In 1999 with the fund raising support of community groups, a retractable enclosure was fitted to prolong the swimming season. In 2015, a skate park was opened to improve sporting facilities in the town, with traffic-free paved access.

In 2002, following the closure of the local cinema, a group of volunteers raised funds for a refurbishment to become one of the first digital cinemas in the UK. It re-opened in 2005 as a 100-seat facility inside an old stable yard, once part of the Crown Inn which closed in 1911. Films were first shown in the old Banqueting Hall of the Inn and moved to the stable yard some years later, due to the popularity of films. The Wotton Electric Picture House (the original name) is now a thriving venue.

The walk from Wotton Hill through Westridge Woods towards the Tyndale Monument, near North Nibley, is a popular local route, especially with dog walkers and families.

On the hills immediately to the east, the Wotton-under-Edge BT Tower formed part of the microwave communication network between Bristol, Corsham and London during the Cold War before decommissioning, and remains a prominent local landmark (albeit without its distinctive horn aerials). Nearby Newark Park is operated by the National Trust as a heritage attraction within walking distance of the town, along with the Neolithic long barrow on a prominent position atop Blackquarries Hill.

Transport 
Wotton has never had a railway station due to the difficult terrain of the Cotswold Edge, although Charfield station, just to the west on flatter ground, was within walking distance from 1844 until its closure in 1965 during the Beeching cuts. Plans to reopen that station have been in motion since 2021, with support from the West of England Combined Authority; a planning application was submitted in September 2022.

Bus services link the town to Charfield, Dursley, Yate, Chipping Sodbury, Nailsworth, Stroud, and Thornbury, and there is an infrequent service to Bristol city centre.

As well as the Cotswold Edge long-distance footpath, the Slow Ways traffic-free accessible walking project also connects Wotton to Dursley, Yate, Thornbury, Tetbury and Sherston.

Gallery

Notable people 

More Adey (1858–1942) – art critic
Ian Alexander – footballer
Thomas de Berkeley, 5th Baron Berkeley (d.1417)
John Biddle – Unitarian
Charles Blagden – physician
Sophie Brzeska – writer.
Bruce Chatwin – writer. Chatwin and his wife Elizabeth owned the house Holwell Farm from the mid-1960s to the 1980s.
Ann Dinham – born Ann Orchard, later Ann Riddiford and then Ann Foster; exiled to Tasmania in 1851 for "inciting a burglary".
U. A. Fanthorpe – poet
Sir Matthew Hale – Lord Chief Justice (1671–1676)
Matthew Blagden Hale – bishop
Evan Hayward – Member of Parliament
Mark Horton – archaeologist
Catherine Johnson – playwright
Richard Knill – missionary
Ian MacDonald (1948–2003) –  music critic and author
Sir Isaac Pitman – creator of Pitman Shorthand, Pitman Place is named after him
Mark Porter – doctor
Sean Rigg – footballer
Jamie Stephens – footballer

Further reading 
 E. S. Lindley. Wotton under Edge: Men and Affairs of a Cotswold Wool Town.  Published by Museum Press, 1962
 Simon Herrick. Under the Hill. (1979).

References

External links 

BBC archive film of Wotton-under-Edge from 1977

Electric Picture House Cinema
Stroud Voices (Wotton-under-Edge filter) – oral history site
 Ordnance Survey Bench Marks (Wotton-under-Edge page) – height above sea level markers

 
Market towns in Gloucestershire
Towns in Gloucestershire
Stroud District
Civil parishes in Gloucestershire
Cotswolds